Throsk railway station served the village of Throsk, Stirling, Scotland from 1890 to 1966.

History 
The station was opened in December 1890 as Throsk Platform by the Caledonian Railway. It was situated just south of the Alloa Swing Bridge.

The station became a junction during the First World war when Bandeath Munitions Depot was established on the peninsula to the west of the swing bridge, the junction was between the station and the bridge.

In 1920–21 the station was renamed Throsk and may also have been known as Throsk Halt at times. It closed to both passengers and goods traffic on 18 April 1966.

References

External links

Disused railway stations in Stirling (council area)
Railway stations in Great Britain opened in 1890
Railway stations in Great Britain closed in 1966
Beeching closures in Scotland
1890 establishments in Scotland
1966 disestablishments in Scotland
Former Caledonian Railway stations